Mesalina bernoullii, also known commonly as Bernoulli's short-nosed desert lizard, is a species of sand-dwelling lizard in the family Lacertidae. The species is endemic to the Middle East.

Etymology
The specific name, bernoullii, is in honor of architect W. Bernoulli.

Geographic range
M. bernoullii occurs in Egypt, Iran, Iraq, Israel, Jordan, Saudi Arabia, and Syria.

Reproduction
M. bernoullii is oviparous.

References

Further reading
Schenkel E (1901). "Achter Nachtrag zum Katalog der herpetologischen Sammlung des Baslers Museums ". Verhandlungen der Naturforschenden Gesellschaft in Basel 13: 142–199. (Eremias bernoullii, new species, pp. 187–188, Figure 7). (in German).

bernoullii
Reptiles described in 1901
Taxa named by Ehrenfried Schenkel